Veterinary medical assistants in Switzerland (Tiermedizinische/r Praxisassistent/in / assistantes en médecine vétérinaire / assistenti medicina veterinari) organized in 1991 in Berne and are represented by the Swiss Association of Veterinary Medical Assistants.  The curriculum is offered in German in two or three schools and in French at a single site—Ecole Panorama in Lausanne—where students meet each Thursday starting in late August during a three-year apprenticeship for lessons in theory and one day per month for practical training.  This training culminates in the award of the National Certificate [Eidgenössisches Fähigkeitszeugnis als gelernte/r / Certificat Fédéral de Capacité / Attestato federale di capacità (CFC)]in veterinary medical assisting.

References

External links
Swiss Association of Veterinary Medical Assistants

Switzerland
Veterinary medicine in Switzerland